The term Naval Air Arm or Fleet Air Arm refers to the naval aviation branch of several naval forces, including:

The Indian Naval Air Arm
The Pakistan Naval Air Arm
The Fleet Air Arm of the Royal Navy
The Royal Australian Navy Fleet Air Arm (RAN)